Juan Perotti (born 12 January 1992) is an Argentine professional footballer who plays as a midfielder for Olimpo.

Career
Perotti began with Estudiantes of the Argentine Primera División. Prior to making his Estudiantes senior debut, Perotti spent four seasons out on loan to Villa San Carlos and Tiro Federal (BB) respectively. For Villa San Carlos, he scored once (versus Platense on 29 August 2014) in seventeen matches over two seasons in Primera B Metropolitana. For Tiro Federal, he played ten fixtures in Torneo Federal A as Tiro Federal were relegated to Torneo Federal B where he featured seven times. He returned to Estudiantes ahead of 2016–17 and eventually made his first-team debut on 23 April 2017 against Huracán.

In February 2018, Perotti terminated his contract with Estudiantes. He subsequently, via a trial with Chilean team Santiago Morning, joined regional Argentine club Racing de Carhué. In January 2019, Perotti signed with Liniers. He'd remain for two seasons, scoring three goals in fifteen appearances in the Torneo Regional Federal Amateur. He also featured for them at regional level in Liga del Sur, notably netting fifteen goals in 2019 as they were crowned champions. On 9 September 2020, Perotti completed a move to Torneo Federal A's Olimpo.

Career statistics
.

Honours
Liniers
Liga del Sur: 2019

References

External links

1992 births
Living people
Sportspeople from Buenos Aires Province
Argentine footballers
Association football midfielders
Argentine Primera División players
Primera B Metropolitana players
Torneo Federal A players
Estudiantes de La Plata footballers
Club Atlético Villa San Carlos footballers
Liniers de Bahía Blanca players
Olimpo footballers